Stephan Ruben Tobias van Baarle (born 25 August 1991) is a Dutch politician, serving as a member of the House of Representatives since 2021. A member of the minority interest party DENK, he also served on the Rotterdam municipal council from 2018 to 2022.

Early life and education 
He was born in 1991 in Rotterdam to a Dutch mother and a Turkish father. Van Baarle was raised by his mother in the Rotterdam neighborhood Vreewijk and attended the high school Vreewijk Lyceum. He studied sociology at Erasmus University Rotterdam and became a junior teacher at his university. He was also active for the Labour Party in 2014.

Politics 
In 2015, when DENK was established, Van Baarle started working as a policy officer for its House caucus and as director of its think tank Statera. He was one of the first members of DENK, which was founded by two MPs who had left the Labour Party the year before. Van Baarle ran for member of parliament in the 2017 general election, being placed fifth on DENK's party list. Besides, he chaired the election program committee. He was not elected, as his party received three seats and his 408 preference votes were not enough to meet the threshold.

Van Baarle was DENK's  in Rotterdam in the 2018 municipal elections. His party won four seats in the municipal council, while  Tunahan Kuzu received almost twice as many votes as Van Baarle. He also remained on as a policy officer. In the council, where he served as caucus leader, Van Baarle successfully proposed a ban on disturbances by the street use of laughing gas together with Livable Rotterdam. He was nominated for Best Politician of Rotterdam by a cooperation of a number of Rotterdam press organizations in both 2018 and 2019. Van Baarle supported DENK's parliamentary leader Farid Azarkan when he was being expelled from the party by its board in May 2020, and he called on the board to resign.

He was DENK's third candidate in the 2021 general election and also served as the party's campaign manager. He was installed as member of the House of Representatives on 31 March after he was elected with 2,449 preference votes. Van Baarle did not leave the municipal council, but he did step down as caucus leader the following month. He was one of the party's  in Rotterdam in the March 2022 municipal elections, leading to the end of this council membership after 29 March. In the House, Van Baarle worked on combatting discrimination in the selection of interns. A motion of his was passed to utilize mystery inspectors to test companies' adherence to the law.

House committees 
Van Baarle is on the following parliamentary committees in the House of Representatives:
 Committee for Agriculture, Nature and Food Quality
 Committee for Education, Culture and Science
 Committee for Infrastructure and Water Management
 Committee for the Interior
 Committee for Social Affairs and Employment

Personal life 
Van Baarle is a resident of Rotterdam and is an agnostic. He is a supporter of football club Feyenoord and a fan of the German band Rammstein, and he plays the guitar.

References 

1991 births
21st-century Dutch politicians
Dutch campaign managers
DENK politicians
Dutch people of Turkish descent
Dutch agnostics
Turkish agnostics
Erasmus University Rotterdam alumni
Living people
Members of the House of Representatives (Netherlands)
Municipal councillors of Rotterdam
Political staffers